These 58 species belong to Terellia, a genus of fruit flies in the family Tephritidae.

Terellia species

 Terellia amberboae Korneyev & Merz, 1996 i c g
 Terellia apicalis (Chen, 1938) i c g
 Terellia armeniaca (Korneyev, 1985) i c g
 Terellia blanda (Richter, 1975) i c g
 Terellia bushi Korneyez, 2006 c g
 Terellia caerulea (Hering, 1939) i c g
 Terellia ceratocera (Hendel, 1913) i c g
 Terellia clarissima Korneyev, 1987 i c g
 Terellia colon (Meigen, 1826) i c g
 Terellia cyanoides Korneyev, 2003 c g
 Terellia cynarae (Rondani, 1870) i c g
 Terellia deserta Korneyev, 1985 i c g
 Terellia dubia Korneyev, 1985 i c g
 Terellia ermolenkoi Korneyev, 1985 i c g
 Terellia euura (Hering, 1942) i c g
 Terellia fuscicornis (Loew, 1844) i c g b
 Terellia gynaecochroma (Hering, 1937) i c g
 Terellia korneyevorum Mohamadzade Namin & Nozari, 2011 g
 Terellia latigenalis Hering, 1942 i c g
 Terellia longicauda (Meigen, 1838) i c g
 Terellia luteola (Wiedemann, 1830) i c g
 Terellia maculicauda (Chen, 1938) i c g
 Terellia matrix Korneyev, 1988 i c g
 Terellia megalopyge (Hering, 1936) i c g
 Terellia montana Korneyez, 2006 c g
 Terellia nigripalpis Hendel, 1927 i c g
 Terellia nigronota (Korneyev, 1985) i c g
 Terellia oasis (Hering, 1938) i c g
 Terellia occidentalis (Snow, 1894) i c g b
 Terellia odontolophi Korneyev, 1993 i c g
 Terellia orheana Korneyev, 1990 i c g
 Terellia oriunda (Hering, 1941) i c g
 Terellia palposa (Loew, 1862) i c g b
 Terellia plagiata (Dahlbom, 1850) i c g
 Terellia popovi Korneyev, 1985 i c g
 Terellia pseudovirens (Hering, 1940) i c g
 Terellia quadratula (Loew, 1869) i c g
 Terellia rhapontici Merz, 1990 i c g
 Terellia ruficauda (Fabricius, 1794) i c g b
 Terellia sabroskyi Freidberg, 1982 i c g
 Terellia sarolensis (Agarwal & Kapoor, 1985) i c g
 Terellia serratulae (Linnaeus, 1758) i c g
 Terellia setifera Hendel, 1927 i c g
 Terellia tarbinskiorum Korneyez, 2006 c g
 Terellia tribulicola (Senior-White, 1922) i c g
 Terellia tristicta (Hering, 1956) i c g
 Terellia tussilaginis (Fabricius, 1775) i c g
 Terellia uncinata White, 1989 i c g
 Terellia vectensis (Collin, 1937) i c g
 Terellia vicina (Chen, 1938) i c g
 Terellia vilis (Hering, 1961) i c g
 Terellia virens (Loew, 1846) i c g
 Terellia virpana Dirlbek, 1980 i c g
 Terellia volgensis Bassov & Tolstoguzova, 1995 i c g
 Terellia whitei V.Korneyev & Mohamadzade Namin, 2013 g
 Terellia winthemi (Meigen, 1826) i c g
 Terellia zerovae Korneyev, 1985 i c g

Data sources: i = ITIS, c = Catalogue of Life, g = GBIF, b = Bugguide.net

References

Terellia